Ngāti Tūkoko may also refer to:

 Ngāti Tūkoko (Ngāti Kahungunu), a Ngāti Kahungunu sub-tribe
 Ngāi Tahu (Rangitāne), a Rangitāne sub-tribe